Sammy Couch, also known as 'Psycho' Sam Cody, is a retired professional wrestler. Couch wrestled for Dale Mann in Kentucky in the late 1970's and early 1980's as the Destroyer.  He was partnered with Terry Herron, The Superdestroyer, and the two became MWA Tag Champions, until Cody lost was unmasked. The two later worked for Ohio promoter Bob Harmon and Kentucky promoter Cliff Lily. When Herron left the company, Cody then took on adopted the character "Pago Sam," a takeoff of a character Herron often played.

Career

Early career
Couch was trained by Crusher Verdu and made his debut in professional wrestling on Thanksgiving Day in 1981 as Sam Cody. Cody mostly wrestled on the independent level, making his career in the Midwest Championship Wrestling (MCW) circuit under the guidance of fellow wrestler and promoter "Big" Jim Lancaster. Cody stayed with the company until the promotion dissolved in 1992. In March and June 2004, the company resurfaced, holding shows in St. Marys, Ohio and Botkins, Ohio. Cody participated in both shows and was also inducted into the Midwest Hall of Fame.

World Wrestling Federation
Cody competed briefly for the World Wrestling Federation. He faced Kamala on the April 5, 1987 episode of WWF Wrestling Challenge; Kamala defeated Cody and left him with kayfabe injuries that required him to be carried from the ring on a stretcher.

USA Pro Wrestling
Cody also held the USA Pro Wrestling Tag-Team champion with the late Big Dick Dudley, going under the alias of 'Psycho' Sam Dudley, a member of the fictional Dudley Family.

Northern Wrestling Federation
Cody had wrestled as a jobber in the WWF and throughout the United States and Germany.  When he joined the Cincinnati, Ohio promotion Northern Wrestling Federation (NWF), Cody started to gain fame on the independent level, even being ranked as one of the top 500 wrestlers in the world in 1992. His most successful gimmick was as half of the 'Kansas City Outlaws' tag team partnership with 'Rough House' Roger Ruffen, a team that was originally started in the MCW territory. Ruffen later interfered in a hair vs. mask match between Cody and Patriot, helping Cody to get the win.

Cody quickly became known as the "Hardcore Legend of The NWF," as he competed in many steel cage matches, as well as TLC matches. Not only was Cody one of the premiere stars of the NWF. Cody's last big match occurred in Fairfield, Ohio against NWF talent Dustin Lillard. The match was under 'garbage can' rules, where garbage cans were at the wrestlers disposal to use as weapons throughout the match. Cody, after breaking his wrist during the match, managed to achieve victory over Lillard via pinfall. Cody was forced into retirement following a doctor's exam, when he failed an MRI test, with doctors suggesting that many years of head shots had finally taken their toll. Shortly thereafter, Cody was inducted into the NWF Hall of Fame.

Championships and accomplishments
Midwest Championship Wrestling
MCW Hall of Fame (Class of 2004)

USA Pro Wrestling
USA Pro Wrestling Tag Team Championship (1 time) - with Big Dick Dudley

References

American male professional wrestlers
Year of birth missing (living people)
The Dudley Brothers members
Living people